Manoranjan Halder  is an Indian politician belonging to the Indian National Congress who was elected from Mathurapur, West Bengal to the Lok Sabha, lower house of the Parliament of India in 1984.

References

1944 births
Living people
People from West Bengal
India MPs 1984–1989
Lok Sabha members from West Bengal